Bernie Ford (born 3 August 1952 in Woking, Surrey) is a British former long-distance runner who trained at Aldershot, Farnham & District AC and competed in the 1976 Summer Olympics and in the 1980 Summer Olympics.

He competed at nine consecutive editions of the IAAF World Cross Country Championships from 1973 to 1981.

He is married to Anne Ford.

References

1952 births
Living people
Sportspeople from Woking
English male marathon runners
Olympic athletes of Great Britain
Athletes (track and field) at the 1976 Summer Olympics
Athletes (track and field) at the 1980 Summer Olympics